Flaxman is both a surname and a given name. Notable people with the name include:

Surname:
Alfred Flaxman (1879–1916), British track and field athlete 
Charles Flaxman (1806–1869), Australian clerk
John Flaxman (1755–1826), English sculptor and draughtsman
Maria Flaxman (1768–1833) English illustrator, half-sister of John
George Flaxman, a British Army private executed for murder in 1887

Given name:
Flaxman Charles John Spurrell, (1842–1915), English archaeologist, geologist and photographer

See also
Flaxman crater, a meteorite crater in South Australia 
Flaxman Gallery, a collection of works by John Flaxman at the University College London
Flaxman Island, the location of the Leffingwell Camp Site in Alaska
 Flaxman typeface, designed by Edward Wright (artist) for New Scotland Yard
FLAxman, a 1927 London telephone exchange on the Director telephone system, which was replaced in about 1968 by the dialling code 352-xxxx

References